Contai Hindu Girls' School is one of the oldest girls' school in the Contai town of Purba Medinipur, West Bengal, India.  It is a Girls Higher Secondary School.

Affiliations
The school is affiliated to the West Bengal Board of Secondary Education and West Bengal Council of Higher Secondary Education for Standard 10th and 12th Board examinations respectively.

References

High schools and secondary schools in West Bengal
Girls' schools in West Bengal
Schools in Purba Medinipur district
1915 establishments in India
Educational institutions established in 1915